Desyatnikovo is a rural locality (a selo) in Tarbagataysky District of the Republic of Buryatia, Russia.

In 2016 Desyatnikovo was included in The Most Beautiful Villages in Russia.

References 

Rural localities in Tarbagataysky District